Michael Joseph Kirwan (December 2, 1886 – July 27, 1970) was an American Democratic politician from Ohio who served as a Representative to the United States Congress for the 19th electoral district of Ohio from 1937 until his death in 1970 in Bethesda, Maryland, which resulted from complications related to a fall. At the peak of his long congressional career, Kirwan was hailed as one of the most influential Democratic members of Congress, particularly on matters related to conservation.

Early years 
Mike Kirwan was born in Wilkes-Barre, Luzerne County, Pennsylvania, a manufacturing town in northeastern Pennsylvania. In 1907, he relocated to Youngstown, Ohio, a center of steel production located just west of the Pennsylvania border. During the First World War Kirwan served overseas as a sergeant in the Three Hundred and Forty-eighth Machine Gun Company with the Sixty-fourth Artillery, United States Army. Records indicate he served between 1917 and 1919.
Kirwan was married to Alice Kane. They had three children, John, Michael and Mary Alice.

Political career 
Upon his return to Youngstown, Kirwan established himself as an outspoken proponent of a plan to construct a Lake Erie to Ohio River canal – a proposal for which he would lobby tirelessly as Congressman from the 19th Congressional District of Ohio. Despite his later occupancy of important committee positions, however, Kirwan was unsuccessful in his efforts to achieve his most cherished goal as a lawmaker. Kirwin served on the Youngstown City Council from 1932 to 1936.

Throughout the 1930s and early 1940s, Kirwan was successful in garnering substantial federal support for a variety of public works projects including dams, reservoirs, public swimming pools, and public park facilities. In 1940, he also helped to secure government funding for the nation's first major housing project, Westlakes Housing Village (later known as Westlakes Terrace), which was situated west of downtown Youngstown. The housing project comprised 618 units capable of sheltering 2,500 people. Erected under government financing, the project received 90 percent of its funding ($2,862,000) on a 60-year loan basis. Upon its completion, Kirwan lauded the housing project as a welcome alternative to what had been a dilapidated residential district, and further declared that it would serve as a model for the nation.

In later years, Westlakes Terrace, like other low-income housing projects, yielded mixed results. The provision of cheap housing proved to be inadequate compensation for the loss of thousands of urban jobs, the decline of public transportation, the advent of suburbanization, and a host of other trends that adversely affected urban dwellers. Westlakes Terrace was recently converted to other purposes.

Powerful testimony to Kirwan's growing influence in the U.S. Congress came in 1948, when he was unanimously elected chairman of the National Democratic Congressional Campaign Committee, the first time a Northern Democrat had been named to that important post. In 1954, Kirwan was widely credited among Democratic Congressional leaders as the architect of the party's success in the November congressional elections. Despite his advancing years, he announced on December 3, 1957 (his 71st birthday) that he would seek a 12th term in Congress. The following year, Kirwan was among scores of Mahoning Valley Democratic candidates who secured sweeping victories; and in 1959, he was elected to his seventh term as chairman of the Democratic Congressional Campaign Committee.

Final years 
Among the highlights of Kirwan's later career was an event held in his honor at Youngstown's Idora Park Ballroom. The keynote speaker at that event was U.S. Senator John F. Kennedy, who would run successfully as the Democratic presidential candidate the following year. In 1968, after being elected to his 17th term as a congressman, Kirwan announced that he would retire from public office at the close of his term. The following year, he was injured in a fall at the University Club at Washington, D.C., and was confined to Bethesda Naval Hospital. Kirwan experienced failing health for the next several months and died in Bethesda in 1970. His funeral was attended by more than 600 people, including a delegation of 50 members of Congress. He is buried at Calvary Cemetery, in Youngstown, Ohio.

Legacy 
While aspects of Kirwan's legacy have proved durable, the constituency he served was adversely affected by deindustrialization, which swept through much of northeastern Ohio starting in the late 1970s.

The primary educational television station in American Samoa bears Kirwan's name.

Kirwan was often an outspoken critic of the expansion of the Gettysburg National Military Park by way of U.S. Interior Department spending. He was once quoted as saying, "We have enough land at Gettysburg. There is no use taking any more."

Kirwan's papers are archived at Youngstown State University's Maag Library Archives and Special Collections.

The Michael J. Kirwan Reservoir impounds the west branch of the Mahoning River in Portage County, Ohio.

Election results

Notes

See also
 List of United States Congress members who died in office (1950–99)

References

 Aley, Howard C. (1975). A Heritage to Share: The Bicentennial History of Youngstown and the Mahoning Valley. Youngstown, OH: The Bicentennial Commission of Youngstown and Mahoning County.

External links 
 
 Kirwan Interview Notes
 Michael J. Kirwan Dam and Reservoir
 Election Results, U.S. Representative from Ohio, 19th District

1886 births
1970 deaths
Ohio city council members
Politicians from Youngstown, Ohio
Politicians from Wilkes-Barre, Pennsylvania
United States Army soldiers
United States Army personnel of World War I
Military personnel from Pennsylvania
Military personnel from Ohio
Accidental deaths from falls
Accidental deaths in Maryland
20th-century American politicians
Democratic Party members of the United States House of Representatives from Ohio